Kosmos 745 ( meaning Cosmos 745), also known as DS-P1-Yu No.76, was a Soviet satellite which was launched in 1975 as part of the Dnepropetrovsk Sputnik programme. It was a  spacecraft, which was built by the Yuzhnoye Design Bureau, and was used as a radar calibration target for anti-ballistic missile tests.

A Kosmos-2I 63SM carrier rocket was used to launch Kosmos 745 from Site 133/1 of the Plesetsk Cosmodrome. The launch occurred at 12:05 UTC on 24 June 1975, and resulted in the successfully insertion of the satellite into low Earth orbit. Upon reaching orbit, the satellite was assigned its Kosmos designation, and received the International Designator 1975-058A. The North American Aerospace Defense Command assigned it the catalogue number 07982.

Kosmos 745 was the seventy-seventh of seventy nine DS-P1-Yu satellites to be launched, and the seventieth of seventy two to successfully reach orbit. It remained in orbit until it decayed and reentered the atmosphere on 12 March 1976.

See also

1975 in spaceflight

References

1975 in spaceflight
Kosmos satellites
Spacecraft launched in 1975
Dnepropetrovsk Sputnik program